The Nicaragua women's national basketball team is the women's national basketball team of Nicaragua. It is managed by the Federación Nicaraguense de Baloncesto (FENIBALON).

The team participated at the 2015 FIBA COCABA Championship for Women and later also at the 2017 Central American Games.

See also
 Nicaragua men's national basketball team
 Nicaragua women's national under-19 basketball team
 Nicaragua women's national under-17 basketball team
 Nicaragua women's national 3x3 team

References

External links
Official website
Archived records of Nicaragua team participations
Latinbasket.com - Nicaragua Women National Team

Women's national basketball teams
Basketball in Nicaragua
Basketball teams in Nicaragua
National sports teams of Nicaragua